The 2011 World Short Track Speed Skating Championships took place between 11 and 13 March 2011 at the Sheffield Arena in Sheffield, England. The World Championships were organised by the ISU which also runs world cups and championships in speed skating and figure skating.

Schedule

Results
* First place is awarded 34 points, second is awarded 21 points, third is awarded 13 points, fourth is awarded 8 points, fifth is awarded 5 points, sixth is awarded 3 points, seventh is awarded 2 points, and eighth is awarded 1 point in the finals of each individual race to determine the overall world champion. The leader after the first 1000m in the 3000m Super-Final is awarded extra 5 points. The relays do not count for the overall classification.

Men

Women

Medal table
7 nations won at least one medal, which represents the highest total ever.

Entries per Event
Each nation can enter up to a maximum of 2 athletes per event, the nations listed below can enter up to three athletes per gender for that respective gender.

Participating countries
124 athletes from 31 nations will compete.

References

External links
 
 ISU Results
 Results book

 
World Short Track Speed Skating Championships
2011 World Short Track Speed Skating Championships
World Short Track Speed Skating Championships
2011 in short track speed skating
Sports competitions in Sheffield
World Short Track Speed Skating Championships
2010s in Sheffield